Pyrometric cones are pyrometric devices that are used to gauge heatwork during the firing of ceramic materials in a kiln. The cones, often used in sets of three, are positioned in a kiln with the wares to be fired and by the members of the set softening and falling over at different temperatures provide a visual indication of when the wares have reached a required state of maturity, a combination of time and temperature. 

Pyrometric cones give a temperature equivalent; they are not simple temperature-measuring devices.  They were especially important historically, before devices for measuring actual kiln temperatures had been developed.

Definition 
The pyrometric cone is "A pyramid with a triangular base and of a defined shape and size; the "cone" is shaped from a carefully proportioned and uniformly mixed batch of ceramic materials so that when it is heated under stated conditions, it will bend due to softening, the tip of the cone becoming level with the base at a definitive temperature. Pyrometric cones are made in series, the temperature interval between the successive cones usually being 20 degrees Celsius. The best known series are Seger Cones (Germany, until 2001), Orton Cones (USA) and Staffordshire Cones (UK)."

Usage 
For some products, such as porcelain and lead-free glazes, it can be advantageous to fire within a two-cone range. The three-cone system can be used to determine temperature uniformity and to check the performance of an electronic controller. The three-cone system consists of three consecutively numbered cones:
 Guide cone – one cone number cooler than firing cone.
 Firing cone – the cone recommended by manufacturer of glaze, slip, etc.
 Guard cone – one cone number hotter than firing cone.

Additionally, most kilns have temperature differences from top to bottom. The amount of difference depends on the design of the kiln, the age of the heating elements, the load distribution in the kiln, and the cone number to which the kiln is fired. Usually, kilns have a greater temperature difference at cooler cone numbers. Cones should be used on the lower, middle and top shelves to determine how much difference exists during firing.  This will aid in the way the kiln is loaded and fired to reduce the difference. Downdraft venting will also even out temperatures variance.

Both temperature and time and sometimes atmosphere affect the final bending position of a cone. Temperature is the predominant variable. The temperature is referred to as an equivalent temperature, since actual firing conditions may vary somewhat from those in which the cones were originally standardized. Observation of cone bending is used to determine when a kiln has reached a desired state. Additionally, small cones or bars can be arranged to mechanically trigger kiln controls when the temperature rises enough for them to deform. Precise, consistent placement of large and small cones must be followed to ensure the proper temperature equivalent is being reached. Every effort needs to be made to always have the cone inclined at 8° from the vertical. Large cones must be mounted 2 inches above the plaque and small cones mounted 15/16 inches. With the cones having their own base, "self-supporting cones" eliminate errors with their mounting.

Control of variability 
Pyrometric cones are sensitive measuring devices and it is important to users that they should remain consistent in the way that they react to heating. Cone manufacturers follow procedures to control variability (within batches and between batches) to ensure that cones of a given grade remain consistent in their properties over long periods. A number of national standards and an ISO standard have been published regarding pyrometric cones.

Even though cones from different manufacturers can have relatively similar numbering systems, they are not identical in their characteristics. If a change is made from one manufacturer to another, then allowances for the differences can sometimes be necessary.

History 
In 1782, Josiah Wedgwood created accurately scaled pyrometric device, with details published in the Philosophical Transactions of the Royal Society of London in 1782 (Vol. LXXII, part 2). This led him to be elected a fellow of the Royal Society.

The modern form of the pyrometric cone was developed by Hermann Seger and first used to control the firing of porcelain wares at the Royal Porcelain Factory, Berlin (Königliche Porzellanmanufaktur, in 1886, where Seger was director. Seger cones are made by a small number of companies and the term is often used as a synonym for pyrometric cones. The Standard Pyrometric Cone Company was founded in Columbus, Ohio, by Edward J. Orton, Jr. in 1896 to manufacture pyrometric cones, and following his death a charitable trust established to operate the company, which is known Edward Orton Jr. Ceramic Foundation, or  Orton Ceramic Foundation.

Ceramic art
A biennial ceramic art exhibition for small work, the Orton Cone Box Show, takes the Orton Cone company's pyrometric cone box as the size constraint for submissions.

Temperature ranges 
The following temperature equivalents for pyrometric cones were retrieved from references in the External Links section.

Notes

References
 Hamer, Frank and Hamer, Janet (1991). The Potter's Dictionary of Materials and Techniques. Third edition. A & C Black Publishers, Limited, London, England. .

External links 
 Temperature equivalents table Nimra & description of Nimra Cerglass pyrometric cones
  Temperature equivalents table Orton Celsius
  Temperature Equivalents and Description of Orton Cones up to Cone 14 
 Temperature equivalents table of Seger pyrometric cones

Pottery
Temperature